The 2008–09 Eastern Counties Football League season was the 67th in the history of the Eastern Counties Football League, a football league in England.

Premier Division

The Premier Division featured 18 clubs which competed in the division last season, along with four new clubs:
Ely City, promoted from Division One
Tiptree United, promoted from Division One
Whitton United, promoted from Division One
Wivenhoe Town, relegated from the Isthmian League

League table

Division One

Division One featured 16 clubs which competed in the division last season, along with four new clubs:
Brantham Athletic, joined from the Suffolk and Ipswich League
Ipswich Wanderers, relegated from the Premier Division
Newmarket Town, relegated from the Premier Division
Swaffham Town, relegated from the Premier Division

League table

References

External links
 Eastern Counties Football League

2008-09
9